William Henry Sherdel (August 15, 1896 – November 14, 1968) was a professional baseball player.  He was a left-handed pitcher over parts of fifteen seasons (1918–1932) with the St. Louis Cardinals and Boston Braves.  For his career, he compiled a 165–146 record in 514 appearances, with a 3.72 earned run average and 839 strikeouts.  In Cardinals franchise history, Sherdel ranks 4th all-time in wins (153), 3rd in games pitched (465), 4th in innings pitched (2450.2), 5th in games started (242), 8th in complete games (144), 4th in losses (131), 5th in hit batsmen (51), and 8th in games finished (152).  Sherdel's 153 wins are the most ever for a Cardinal left-hander. Sherdel achieved the unusual distinction of giving up at least 10 runs in three consecutive starts during the 1929 season – 10 runs on the 29th of June, 13 runs on the 3rd of July and 10 runs on the 6th of July.

Sherdel was a member of two National League pennant-winning Cardinals teams, in 1926 and 1928, winning the World Series in 1926.  He faced the New York Yankees both times.  In World Series play, he compiled an 0–4 record in 4 appearances, with a 3.26 earned run average and 6 strikeouts.

Sherdel was an above average hitting pitcher in his 15-year major league career. He posted a .223 batting average (214-for-960) scoring 96 runs, with 35 doubles, 5 triples, 9 home runs, 86 RBI and drawing 63 bases on balls. He was used as a pinch hitter and played a few games at right field and first base.

Sherdel was born and later died in McSherrystown, Pennsylvania, at the age of 72.

See also
 List of St. Louis Cardinals team records
 List of Major League Baseball annual saves leaders

References

External links

1896 births
1968 deaths
Major League Baseball pitchers
Baseball players from Pennsylvania
St. Louis Cardinals players
Boston Braves players
Milwaukee Brewers (minor league) players
Hanover Hornets players
Hanover Raiders players
Rochester Red Wings players